Kashi Mitra Ghat crematorium or Kashi Mitra Burning Ghat is a crematory located at Strand Bank Road, Bagbazar, Kolkata.

See also 
 Nimtala crematorium
 Keoratola crematorium

References 

Crematoria in India
Death in India